The men's 4 x 100 metres relay at the 2007 All-Africa Games was held on July 19–20.

Medalists

Results

Heats
Qualification: First 3 teams of each heat (Q) plus the next 2 fastest (q) qualified for the final.

Final

References
Results

Relay